Nağılar or Nagilar may refer to:

Nağılar, Gadabay, a village in the Gadabay District of Azerbaijan
Nağılar, Shusha, a village in the Shusha District of Azerbaijan